The Shire of Jerramungup is a  local government area in the Great Southern region of Western Australia, about  northeast of Albany and about  southeast of the state capital, Perth. The seat of government is the town of Jerramungup.

The park is one of the most botanically significant national parks in Australia, containing 20% of Western Australia's described plant species - more than 1,800 in total.

History
The Shire of Jerramungup was established on 1 July 1982. It previously comprised the eastern half of the Shire of Gnowangerup.

Wards
As of the 2003 elections, the shire is not divided into wards, and its 7 councillors sit at large.

Towns and localities
The towns and localities of the Shire of Jerramungup with population and size figures based on the most recent Australian census:

(* indicates locality is only partially located within this shire)

Heritage-listed places

As of 2023, 17 places are heritage-listed in the Shire of Jerramungup, of which three are on the State Register of Heritage Places.

References

External links
 

Jerramungup